Eotapinoma is an extinct genus of ants of the subfamily Dolichoderinae. It was described by Dlussky in 1988.

Species
There are three fossil species described to the genus.

Eotapinoma compacta Dlussky, 1988
Eotapinoma gracilis Dlussky, 1988
Eotapinoma macalpini Dlussky, 1999

References

†
Hymenoptera of North America
Prehistoric insects of Europe
Fossil taxa described in 1988
Fossil ant genera
Canadian amber